Conchobhar Ó Coineóil was Bishop of Killala from 1383 until an unknown date.

References

1423 deaths
14th-century Roman Catholic bishops in Ireland
Bishops of Killala
People from County Galway
Year of birth unknown